Claude Buffet (19 May 1933 – 28 November 1972) was a French criminal who was executed along with his accomplice, Roger Bontems (1936–1972), on 28 November 1972 by guillotine at La Santé Prison and buried at Ivry Cemetery. Both men had been convicted of the murders of prison warder Guy Girardot and prison nurse Nicole Comte in 1971, whom they had taken hostage while Buffet was already serving a life sentence in Clairvaux Prison. Robert Badinter was their defence lawyer.

References 

1933 births
1972 deaths
People from Reims
Burials at Ivry Cemetery
20th-century French criminals
French prisoners sentenced to life imprisonment
Prisoners sentenced to life imprisonment by France
Executed French people
French people convicted of murder
People convicted of murder by France
People executed by France by guillotine
People executed by the French Fifth Republic
People executed for murder